Guy Forget and Henri Leconte were the defending champions, but did not participate this year.

Grant Connell and Patrick Galbraith won the title, defeating Byron Black and Jonathan Stark 7–5, 6–3 in the final.

Seeds

Draw

Finals

Top half

Bottom half

References
Draw

1994 ATP Tour
1994 Newsweek Champions Cup and the Evert Cup